C54 or C-54 may refer to:
 , an Admirable-class minesweeper of the Mexican Navy
 Caldwell 54, an open cluster in the constellation Monoceros
 Douglas C-54 Skymaster, an American transport aircraft
 Giuoco Piano, a chess opening
 JNR Class C54, a Japanese steam locomotive
 Holidays with Pay (Sea) Convention, 1936 of the International Labour Organization
 Uterine cancer